Eric James Bigby (born 6 March 1940) is an Australian former sprinter who competed in the 1964 Summer Olympics.

References

External links
 
 
 
 
 
 

1940 births
Living people
Australian male sprinters
Olympic athletes of Australia
Athletes (track and field) at the 1964 Summer Olympics
Athletes (track and field) at the 1970 British Commonwealth Games
Sportsmen from New South Wales
Commonwealth Games competitors for Australia